The Halki Theological School Gardens are located in the top of the hill of hope in Heybeliada (halki island). Halki seminary, also known as halki theological school, stood there since 1844 as the lighthouse of Ecumenical Patriarchate of Constantinople. Due to its closure since 1971, it still has the byzantine church of holy trinity and is open to public. 

The site has no significant gardens after 1971. Reconstruction attempt begun in 2013 and is based on research of Landscape Architecture Laboratory of the Neapolis University Paphos under the supervision of Professor Nerantzia Tzortzi after the invitation of the Abbot of Monastery of Holy Trinity and Bishop of Bursa, Elpidophoros.

Garden thematics

The goal was to create a thematic garden divided in symbolic areas, unique for a cloister-like this, based in Byzantine gardens model:

The Trail of Virtues

"The trail of virtues" is a garden path based on a 12th century text, written by Codex Oxoniensis Clarkianus 39 and it was recently located in Oxford. The particular route is conducted be 14 plants, planted at the school's entrance, in an attempt to help  reach a devout state of mind, thus, fit to the school's environment. 

The plants and the virtues they linked to are as follows: 

Cedrus libani–Pinus halepensis–Cupressus sempervirens…. Self-discipline
Citrus sinensis…. Prudence
Phoenix dactylifera…. Justice
Lilium candidum…. Indigence 
Ficus carica….. Gentleness
Vitis vinifera….. Calmness 
Punica granatum… Courage Prunus persica…. HumilityLiquidambar orientalis… Prayer Smilax aspera…. Knowledge Olea europaea…. CharityRubus idaeus…. Obedience 

The edible garden

"The edible garden" is a botanical synthesis, conducted by fruit trees, vegetables and herbs and is highlighted by a biodynamic vineyard. The specific garden represents our effort to cultivate food items and is situated at the garden's perimeter, as reminder of Hortus conclusus pattern. 

The garden of bible

"The garden of bible" is conducted by 66 out of the 82 plants that are mentioned in the Bible. Most of them are planted around the church area but we can also find some scattered around the garden. 

In addition, in between the trees of "The Trail of Virtues", there was created a "Byzantine Meadow" that consists of tulips, dandelions, cyclamens, and other plants that have a special meaning in the Byzantine semantics. 
The above creations compose a sustainable self-managed monastic garden, with strong symbolisms and aesthetic interest.  Last but not least, all needed material comes from Greek and Turkish contributions and also, several volunteers participated in the project.

Thematic design approach as byzantine and orthodox christianity monastic garden tradition through the Ages

Visual sources, such as miniature and religious icons, were essential for the analysis of the architectural schemes and spatial configuration of the garden. Primary sources of material included thematic institutes and archives related to Byzantine gardens, the most important of which are the Hellenic Institute of Byzantine and Post-Byzantine Studies in Venice, the Byzantine Research Centre in Oxford University, and the library and archive in Dumbarton Oaks in Washington DC, which provided both textual and visual sources, partly digitalized. The tools that helped in this research were the monastic libraries (Halki Seminary, Mount Athos, Sinai Monastery), the recording of local flora (Botanical Gardens of Byzantine Empire Territories), the development of any gardens or thematic "green" sections in the existing gardens, the use of archival material from General Greek Archives , Ephorates of Byzantine Antiquities all over Greece and other sources, elements from the landscape, like monumental olive and other tree species the evolution of the vegetation and human intervention.

See also
Archbishop Elpidophoros of America

References

Gardens in Turkey